Paschalis Melissas (born 9 March 1982) is a Greek former professional footballer who played as a left-back.

Career
Born in Xanthi, Melissas began playing football with local side Skoda Xanthi F.C. in the Greek Super League.

External links
Profile at epae.org
Guardian Football
Profile at Onsports.gr

1982 births
Living people
Greek footballers
Xanthi F.C. players
Ergotelis F.C. players
Atromitos F.C. players
Levadiakos F.C. players
AEP Paphos FC players
Panetolikos F.C. players
Super League Greece players
Cypriot First Division players
Greek expatriate footballers
Greek expatriate sportspeople in Cyprus
Expatriate footballers in Cyprus
Footballers from Xanthi
Association football central defenders